Jaiveer Agarwal (24 September 1930 – 16 November 2009) was an Indian ophthalmologist and founder of Dr. Agarwal's Eye Hospital. He was the  recipient of the Padma Bhushan for medicine from then President of India A P J Abdul Kalam in March 2006.

Life
Jaiveer Agarwal was born to the Sikh family of Dr. R.S. Agarwal. He married Tahira, who was also an ophthalmologist. The couple went to Madras, where they set up a small clinic. They had a daughter and a son.

The Agarwals screened and operated on thousands of villages and campaigned for eye donations to treat corneal blindness, and correcting refractive errors among schoolchildren.

Tahira Agarwal died in April 2009 and Jaiveer died on 16 November 2009.

References

Indian ophthalmologists
Recipients of the Padma Bhushan in medicine
2009 deaths
Medical doctors from Chennai
1930 births
20th-century Indian medical doctors
20th-century surgeons